The N9 is a national route in South Africa that connects George with the N1 at Colesberg, via Graaff-Reinet and Middelburg.

Route

Western Cape 
The N9 begins just south-east of George in the Western Cape at an intersection with the N2. It runs concurrently with the N12 through the center of George and then north over the Outeniqua Pass. At the top of the pass, at the intersection with the R62, the N9 and N12 split, with the N12 being cosigned with the R62 northwards towards Oudtshoorn while the N9 turns east, cosigned with the R62, to run along the northern side of the Outeniqua Mountains and over Potjiesberg Pass.

After 71 kilometres, the N9 and the R62 split, with the R62 becoming its own road eastwards while the N9 turns northwards and enters the town of Uniondale, before becoming the Buyspoort Pass and proceeding onwards to Willowmore in the Eastern Cape.

Eastern Cape 
From Willowmore, the N9 travels across the Eastern Cape Karoo as the Perdepoort Pass, through Aberdeen to Graaf-Reinet. At Aberdeen, the N9 is joined by the R61 and they are concurrent through Graaf-Reinet (where they meet the R63) and for the next 46 kilometers before the R61 becomes its own road eastwards near Nieu-Bethesda.

From Graaf-Reinet it crosses the Sneeuberge through Naudesberg Pass and Lootsberg Pass to Middelburg, where it meets the N10. The N10 joins the N9 to form an eastern bypass around Middelburg before proceeding northwards out of the town. After being concurrent for 24 kilometers, the N10 becomes its own road north-west towards De Aar. The N9 continues northwards, entering the Northern Cape, through Noupoort, to end at an intersection with the N1 just outside Colesberg.

Uniondale Ghost
An urban legend in the "vanishing hitchhiker" tradition arose after a girl named Marie Charlotte Roux was killed in an auto accident not far from Uniondale on Easter Sunday of 1968. According to press reports, beginning in 1973 and for years afterward around the anniversary of her death, the girl's spirit hitchhiked along the road and allegedly vanished after being picked up by various drivers. According to folklorist Sigrid Schmidt:

See also
R306 (Eastern Cape) connecting road

References

External links

 South African National Roads Agency
 Route listing
 :fr:Outeniqua Pass

National Roads in South Africa
Reportedly haunted locations in South Africa
Roads in South Africa